The Monastery of Saint James the Mutilated is a 6th-century Melkite Greek Catholic monastery in Qara, Syria. The monastery is dedicated to Saint James the Mutilated.

Murals
The National Museum of Damascus holds a section from a fresco that once decorated the apse of the altar of the monastery's church. The fragment dates from the Ayyubid dynasty.

"The panel portrays a winged angel whose head is surrounded by a halo of light. His hair is long and his head is tied with a fillet. He wears white clothing and lifts his right hand in benediction, while holding a rope in his left hand. His gaze reflects piety and faith. The panel was executed in varying shades of brown and grey in addition to red, blue and green.

Art historians note that the iconographic facial features are those of the Archangel Michael, one of the highest and most important of the angels. Indeed, the folds of the garments, the features of the face and the style of shading conform very closely to depictions on the third-layer paintings of the Monastery of Mar Musa al-Habashi (St Moses, the Ethiopian) which lies nearby and flourished contemporaneously."

Syrian Civil War
In 2013, as part of the Syrian Civil War, after the Al Nusra siege, the army of Hezbollah broke the siege and saved the monastic community 

The monastery's website offers an eyewitness report of wartime events in the village of Qara.

See also
Agnes Mariam de la Croix, a Mother Superior of this monastery

References

External links
 Monastery of Saint James the Mutilated website 

Christian monasteries established in the 6th century
Attacks on churches in Asia
Eastern Catholic monasteries in Syria
Melkite Greek Catholic Church in Syria
An-Nabek District
Buildings and structures in Rif Dimashq Governorate